Van Hoesen is a surname. Notable people with the surname include:

Beth Van Hoesen (1926–2010), American artist
K. David van Hoesen (1926–2016), bassoonist
Peter Van Hoesen (born 1970), Belgian musician and composer

See also
Jan Van Hoesen House, a house in Columbia County, New York, United States

Surnames of Dutch origin